Albert Beard (born April 27, 1942) is a retired American basketball player.

Born in Fort Valley, Georgia, Beard played college basketball for the Norfolk State University.

He played for the New Jersey Americans (1967–68) in the American Basketball Association for 12 games.

External links

1942 births
Living people
American men's basketball players
Basketball players from Georgia (U.S. state)
Centers (basketball)
New Jersey Americans players
Norfolk State Spartans men's basketball players